Lakeside is the debut album by Lakeside. Released in 1977, it was produced by Frank Wilson and Terri McFadden.

Track listing
"Shine on (Lift Your Spirit Higher)" (Beloyd Taylor, Peter Cor)	  	
"Taboo" (Ernestine Madison)		
"Miss Look But Don't Touch" (John Fox)		
"I'll Be There Knocking" (Frank Wilson)		
"Diamond Girl (Tell Me Why You're Crying)" (Frank Wilson) 		
"If I Didn't Have You" (Frank Wilson, John Footman)		
"It's Not Only the Outside That Counts" (Frank Wilson, Ernestine Madison)		
"Epilogue"

Personnel
Lakeside

Additional musicians
James Jamerson, Nathan Watts - bass
Frederick Lewis - congas
Raymond Pounds - drums
Billy Cooper, Greg Poree, Steve Beckmeier - guitar
Bill King, Jerry Peters, John Barnes - keyboards
Jack Ashford - percussion
Jerry Peters, Sanford Shire - string arrangements and orchestrations 
Michael Boddicker - synthesizer

External links
 Lakeside-Lakeside (1977) at Discogs

1977 debut albums
Albums produced by Frank Wilson (musician)
Lakeside (band) albums